Edmontosaurus annectens (meaning "connected lizard from Edmonton") is a species of flat-headed and duck-billed (hadrosaurid) dinosaur from the very end of the Cretaceous Period, in what is now North America. Remains of E. annectens have been preserved in the Frenchman, Hell Creek, and Lance Formations. All of these formations are dated to the late Maastrichtian stage of the Late Cretaceous Period, representing the last three million years before the extinction of the dinosaurs (between 68 and 66 million years ago). E. annectens is also found in the Laramie Formation, and  magnetostratigraphy suggests an age of 69-68 Ma for the Laramie Formation. Edmontosaurus annectens is known from numerous specimens, including at least twenty partial to complete skulls, discovered in the U.S. states of Montana, South Dakota, North Dakota, Wyoming and Colorado and the Canadian province of Saskatchewan. E. annectens exhibits one of the most striking examples of the "duckbill" snout common to hadrosaurs. It has a long taxonomic history, and specimens have at times been classified in the genera Diclonius, Trachodon, Hadrosaurus, Claosaurus, Thespesius, Anatosaurus and Anatotitan, before being grouped together in Edmontosaurus.

Discovery and history
E. annectens has a complicated taxonomic history, with various specimens having been classified in a variety of genera. Its history involves Anatosaurus, Anatotitan, Claosaurus, Diclonius, Hadrosaurus, Thespesius, and Trachodon, as well as Edmontosaurus. References predating the 1980s typically use Anatosaurus, Claosaurus, Diclonius, Thespesius, or Trachodon for E. annectens fossils, depending on author and date.

Cope's Diclonius mirabilis
 
The history of E. annectens predates both Edmontosaurus and annectens. The first good specimen, the former holotype (specimen on which a taxonomic name is based) of Anatosaurus copei (Anatotitan), was a complete skull and most of a skeleton collected in 1882 by Dr. J. L. Wortman and R. S. Hill for American paleontologist Edward Drinker Cope. This specimen, found in Hell Creek Formation rocks, came from northeast of the Black Hills of South Dakota and originally had extensive skin impressions. It was missing most of the pelvis and part of the torso due to a stream cutting through it. The bill had impressions of a horny sheath with a tooth-like series of interlocking points on the upper and lower jaws. When describing this specimen AMNH 5730, Cope assigned it to the species Diclonius mirabilis. This species name was created by combining Diclonius, a hadrosaurid genus Cope had named earlier from teeth, with Trachodon mirabilis, an older name based on teeth and published by Joseph Leidy. Cope believed that Leidy had failed to properly characterize the genus Trachodon and later abandoned its use, so he assigned the old species to his newer genus. Leidy had come to recognize that his Trachodon was based on the remains of multiple kinds of dinosaurs, and though he had made some attempts to revise the genus, he had not yet made any formal declaration of his intentions.

Cope's description promoted hadrosaurids as amphibious, contributing to this long-time image. His reasoning was that the teeth of the lower jaw were weakly connected to the bone and liable to break off if used to consume terrestrial food, and he described the beak as weak as well. However, aside from misidentifying several of the skull bones, by chance the lower jaws were missing the walls supporting the teeth from the inside; the teeth were actually well-supported. Cope intended to describe the skeleton as well as the skull, but his promised paper never appeared. It was purchased for the American Museum of Natural History in 1899, where it acquired its present designation AMNH 5730.

Several years after Cope's description, his rival Othniel Charles Marsh published on a sizable lower jaw recovered by John Bell Hatcher in 1889 from Lance Formation rocks in Niobrara County, Wyoming. Marsh named this partial jaw Trachodon longiceps. It is cataloged as YPM 616. As noted by Lull and Wright, this long slender partial jaw shares with Cope's specimen a prominent ridge running on its side.

A second mostly complete skeleton (AMNH 5886) was found in 1904 in Hell Creek Formation rocks at Crooked Creek in central Montana by Oscar Hunter, a rancher. Upon finding the partially exposed specimen, he and a companion argued about whether or not the remains were recent or fossil. Hunter demonstrated that they were brittle and thus stone by kicking the tops off the vertebrae, an act later lamented by the eventual collector Barnum Brown. Another cowboy, Alfred Sensiba, bought the specimen from Hunter for a pistol, and later sold it to Brown, who excavated it for the American Museum of Natural History in 1906. This specimen had a nearly complete vertebral column, permitting the restoration of Cope's specimen. In 1908, these two specimens were mounted side by side in the American Museum of Natural History, under the name Trachodon mirabilis. Cope's specimen is positioned on all fours with its head down, as if feeding, because it has the better skull, while Brown's specimen, with a less perfect skull, is posed bipedally with the head less accessible. Henry Fairfield Osborn described the tableau as representing the two animals feeding along a marsh, the standing individual having been startled by the approach of a Tyrannosaurus. Impressions of appropriate plant remains and shells based on associated fossils were included on the base of the group, including ginkgo leaves, Sequoia cones, and horsetail rushes.

Marsh's Claosaurus annectens

The species now known as Edmontosaurus annectens was named in 1892 as Claosaurus annectens by Othniel Charles Marsh. This species is based on USNM 2414, a partial skull-roof and skeleton, with a second skull and skeleton, YPM 2182, designated the paratype. Both were collected in 1891 by John Bell Hatcher from the late Maastrichtian-age Upper Cretaceous Lance Formation of Niobrara County (then part of Converse County), Wyoming. This species has some historical footnotes attached: it is among the first dinosaurs to receive a skeletal restoration, and is the first hadrosaurid so restored; and YPM 2182 and UNSM 2414 are, respectively, the first and second essentially complete mounted dinosaur skeletons in the United States. YPM 2182 was put on display in 1901, and USNM 2414 in 1904.

In the first decade of the twentieth century, two additional important specimens of C. annectens were recovered. The first, the "Trachodon mummy" (AMNH 5060), was discovered in 1908 by Charles Hazelius Sternberg and his sons in Lance Formation rocks near Lusk, Wyoming. Sternberg was working for the British Museum of Natural History, but Henry Fairfield Osborn of the American Museum of Natural History was able to purchase the specimen for $2,000. The Sternbergs recovered a second similar specimen from the same area in 1910, not as well-preserved but also found with skin impressions. They sold this specimen (SM 4036) to the Senckenberg Museum in Germany.

Canadian discoveries
Edmontosaurus itself was coined in 1917 by Lawrence Lambe for two partial skeletons found in the Horseshoe Canyon Formation (formerly the lower Edmonton Formation) along the Red Deer River of southern Alberta, Canada. The Horseshoe Canyon Formation is older than the rocks in which Claosaurus annectens was found. Lambe found that his new dinosaur compared best to Cope's Diclonius mirabilis.

In 1926, Charles Mortram Sternberg named Thespesius saskatchewanensis for NMC 8509, a skull and partial skeleton from the Wood Mountain plateau of southern Saskatchewan. He had collected this specimen in 1921, from rocks that were assigned to the Lance Formation, now the Frenchman Formation. NMC 8509 included an almost complete skull, numerous vertebrae, partial shoulder and hip girdles, and partial hind limbs, representing the first substantial dinosaur specimen recovered from Saskatchewan. Sternberg opted to assign it to Thespesius because that was the only hadrosaurid genus known from the Lance Formation at the time.

Early classifications
Because of the incomplete understanding of hadrosaurids at the time, following Marsh's death in 1899 Claosaurus annectens was variously classified as a species of Claosaurus, Thespesius or Trachodon. Opinions varied greatly; textbooks and encyclopedias drew a distinction between the "Iguanodon-like" Claosaurus annectens and the "duck-billed" Hadrosaurus (based on Cope's Diclonius mirabilis), while Hatcher explicitly identified C. annectens as synonymous with the hadrosaurid represented by those same duck-billed skulls, the two differentiated only by individual variation or distortion from pressure. Hatcher's revision, published in 1902, was sweeping: he considered almost all hadrosaurid genera then known as synonyms of Trachodon. This included Cionodon, Diclonius, Hadrosaurus, Ornithotarsus, Pteropelyx, and Thespesius, as well as Claorhynchus and Polyonax, fragmentary genera now thought to be horned dinosaurs. Hatcher's work led to a brief consensus until about 1910, when new material from Canada and Montana showed a greater diversity of hadrosaurids than previously suspected. Charles W. Gilmore in 1915 reassessed hadrosaurids and recommended that Thespesius be reintroduced for hadrosaurids from the Lance Formation and rock units of equivalent age, and that Trachodon, based on inadequate material, should be restricted to a hadrosaurid from the older Judith River Formation and its equivalents. In regards to Claosaurus annectens, he recommended that it be considered the same as Thespesius occidentalis. A multiplicity of names resumed, with the American Museum duckbills being known as Diclonius mirabilis, Trachodon mirabilis, Trachodon annectens, Claosaurus, or Thespesius.

Anatosaurus to the present

This confusing situation was temporarily resolved in 1942 by Richard Swann Lull and Nelda Wright. In their monograph on hadrosaurian dinosaurs of North America, they opted to settle the questions revolving around the American Museum duckbills, Marsh's Claosaurus annectens, and several other species by creating a new generic name. They created the new genus Anatosaurus ("duck lizard", because of its wide, duck-like beak; Latin anas = duck + Greek sauros = lizard) and made Marsh's species the type species, calling it Anatosaurus annectens.  To this genus, they also assigned Marsh's Trachodon longiceps, a pair of species that had been assigned to Thespesius under Gilmore's "Lance Formation hadrosaurid" conception (T. edmontoni from Gilmore in 1924 and T. saskatchewanensis), and Cope's Diclonius mirabilis. Lull and Wright decided to remove the American Museum specimens from Diclonius (or Trachodon) because they found no convincing reason to assign the specimens to either. Because this left the skeletons without a species name, Lull and Wright gave them their own species, Anatosaurus copei, in honor of Cope. Cope's original specimen (AMNH 5730) was made the holotype of the species, with Brown's (AMNH 5886) as the plesiotype. Anatosaurus would come to be called the "classic duck-billed dinosaur."

This state of affairs persisted for several decades, until Michael K. Brett-Surman reexamined the pertinent material for his graduate studies in the 1970s and 1980s. The name Edmontosaurus annectens was first coined some time in the 1980s. He concluded that the type species of Anatosaurus, A. annectens, was actually a species of Edmontosaurus, and that A. copei was different enough to warrant its own genus. Although theses and dissertations are not regarded as official publications by the International Commission on Zoological Nomenclature, which regulates the naming of organisms, his conclusions were known to other paleontologists, and were adopted by several popular works of the time. His replacement name, Anatotitan (Latin anas ("duck") and the Greek Titan, meaning large), was known and published as such in the popular literature by 1990. Formal publication of the name Anatotitan copei took place the same year, in an article co-written by Brett-Surman with Ralph Chapman (although the name is sometimes credited as Brett-Surman vide Chapman and Brett-Surman because it came out of Brett-Surman's work). Because the type species of Anatosaurus (A. annectens) was sunk into Edmontosaurus, the name Anatosaurus is abandoned as a junior synonym of Edmontosaurus.

Of the remaining species of Anatosaurus, A. saskatchewanensis and A. edmontoni were assigned to Edmontosaurus as well,  and A. longiceps went to Anatotitan, as either a second species or as a synonym of A. copei. A. longiceps may be a synonym of E. annectens, though it has also been treated as a nomen dubium by some.

The conception of Edmontosaurus that emerged included three valid species: the type E. regalis, E. annectens (including Anatosaurus edmontoni, emended to edmontonensis), and E. saskatchewanensis. The debate about the proper taxonomy of the A. copei specimens continues to the present: returning to Hatcher's argument of 1902, Jack Horner, David B. Weishampel, and Catherine Forster regarded Anatotitan copei as representing specimens of Edmontosaurus annectens with crushed skulls. In 2007 another "mummy" was announced; nicknamed "Dakota", it was discovered in 1999 by Tyler Lyson, and came from the Hell Creek Formation of North Dakota.

In a 2011 study by Nicolás Campione and David Evans, the authors conducted the first-ever morphometric analysis of the various specimens assigned to Edmontosaurus. They concluded that only two species are valid: E. regalis, from the late Campanian, and E. annectens, from the late Maastrichtian. Their study provided further evidence that Anatotitan copei is a synonym of E. annectens; specifically, that the long, low skull of A. copei is the result of ontogenetic change and represents mature E. annectens individuals. E. saskatechwanensis represents young E. annectens, and Anatosaurus edmontoni specimens belong to E. regalis, not E. annectens. The reassessment of Edmontosaurus assigns twenty skulls to E. annectens. Adult skulls can be distinguished from skulls of E. regalis by the elongate snout and other details of skull anatomy.

Description

The skull and skeleton of E. annectens are well-known. Most specimens are somewhat shorter, representing individuals that are not fully grown. E. annectens may have weighed about 6.6 metric tons (7.3 tons) when fully grown. 

The skull of E. annectens is known for its long, wide muzzle. Cope compared this feature to that of a goose in side view, and to a short-billed spoonbill in top view. The skull was longer and lower proportionally than in any other known hadrosaurid. The toothless portion of the anterior mandible was relatively longer than in any hadrosaur. The extreme length and breadth did not appear until an individual reached maturity, so many specimens lack the distinctive shape. The bones surrounding the large openings for the nostrils formed deep pockets around the openings. The eye sockets were rectangular and longer front to back than top to bottom, although this may have been exaggerated by postmortem crushing. The skull roof was flat and lacked a bony crest, and the quadrate bone that formed the articulation with the lower jaw was distinctly curved. The lower jaw was long and straight, lacking the downward curve seen in other hadrosaurids, and possessing a heavy ridge running its length. The predentary was wide and shovel-like. The ridge on the lower jaw may have reinforced the long, slender structure.

As mounted, the vertebral column of E. annectens includes twelve neck, twelve back, nine sacral, and at least thirty tail vertebrae. The limb bones were longer and more lightly built than those of other hadrosaurids of comparable size. E. annectens had a distinctive pelvis, based on the proportions and form of the pubis bone. E. annectens, like other hadrosaurids, could move both on two legs and on four legs. It probably preferred to forage for food on four legs, but ran on two. Henry Fairfield Osborn used the skeletons in the American Museum of Natural History to portray both quadrupedal and bipedal stances for E. annectens.

Classification

 
E. annectens was a saurolophine or "flat-headed" hadrosaurid; this group was historically known as Hadrosaurinae. Species now considered to be synonyms of Edmontosaurus annectens were long recognized as closely related to both the genus and the species. However, the skull of the sub-adult type specimen of E. annectens differs noticeably from fully mature remains, so many researchers had classified the two growth stages as different species or even genera. On the other side of the issue, other authors, from John Bell Hatcher in 1902, to Jack Horner, David B. Weishampel, and Catherine Forster in 2004, and most recently Nicolás Campione and David Evans, have proposed that the large, flat-headed specimens most recently classified as Anatotitan copei belong to E. annectens.

E. annectens was also historically classified in an independent genus, Anatosaurus, following the influential 1942 revision of Hadrosauridae by Richard Swann Lull and Nelda Wright, until it was reclassified as a species of Edmontosaurus by Michael K. Brett-Surman. With the discovery that A. copei and E. annectens likely represent the same species, some paleontologists have proposed using Anatosaurus as a valid genus name for E. annectens.

The cladogram below follows Godefroit et al. (2012) analysis.

Paleobiology
 
As hadrosaurids, individuals of Edmontosaurus annectens would have been large herbivores, eating plants with a sophisticated skull that permitted a grinding motion analogous to chewing. Their teeth were continually replaced and packed into dental batteries that contained hundreds of teeth, only a relative handful of which were in use at any time. Plant material would have been cropped by the broad beak, and held in the jaws by a cheek-like structure. Feeding would have been from the ground up to around 4 meters (13 ft) above. Like other hadrosaurs, they could have moved both bipedally and quadrupedally.

The extensive depressions surrounding its nasal openings may have hosted nasal diverticula. These postulated diverticula would have taken the form of inflatable soft-tissue sacs. Such sacs could be used for both visual and auditory signals.

A preserved rhamphotheca present in specimen LACM 23502, housed in the Los Angeles County Museum, also indicates the beak of Edmontosaurus was more hook-shaped and extensive than many illustrations in scientific and public media have previously depicted.

Growth

In a 2011 study, Campione and Evans recorded data from all known "edmontosaur" skulls from the Campanian and Maastrichtian and used it to plot a morphometric' graph, comparing variable features of the skull with skull size. Their results showed that within both recognized Edmontosaurus species, many features previously used to classify additional species or genera were directly correlated with skull size. Campione and Evans interpreted these results as strongly suggesting that the shape of Edmontosaurus skulls changed dramatically as they grew. This has led to several apparent mistakes in classification in the past. The three previously recognized Maastrichtian edmontosaur species likely represent growth stages of a single species, with E. saskatchewanensis representing juveniles, E. annectens subadults, and Anatotitan copei fully mature adults. The skulls became longer and flatter as the animals grew. In a 2022 study, Wosik and Evans proposed that E. annectens reached maturity in 9 years of age based on their analysis for various specimens from different loaclities. They found the result to be similar to that of other hadrosaurs.

Paleoecology

True E. annectens remains are known only from latest Maastrichtian-age rocks of the Hell Creek and Lance Formations from South Dakota, Montana, and Wyoming, USA and the Frenchman Formation of Saskatchewan, Canada.

The Lancian time interval was the last interval before the Cretaceous–Paleogene extinction event that eliminated non-avian dinosaurs. Edmontosaurus was one of the more common dinosaurs of the interval. Robert Bakker reports that it made up one-seventh of the large dinosaur sample, with most of the rest (five-sixths) made up of the horned dinosaur Triceratops. The coastal plain Triceratops–Edmontosaurus association, dominated by Triceratops, extended from Colorado to Saskatchewan. Typical dinosaur faunas of the Lancian formations where Edmontosaurus annectens has been found also included the hypsilophodont Thescelosaurus, the rare ceratopsid Torosaurus, the pachycephalosaurid Pachycephalosaurus, the ankylosaurid Ankylosaurus, and the theropods Ornithomimus, Pectinodon, Acheroraptor, Dakotaraptor, and Tyrannosaurus.

The Hell Creek Formation, as typified by exposures in the Fort Peck area of Montana, has been interpreted as a flat forested floodplain, with a relatively dry subtropical climate that supported a variety of plants ranging from angiosperm trees, to conifers such as bald cypress, to ferns and ginkgos. The coastline was hundreds of kilometers or miles to the east. Stream-dwelling turtles and tree-dwelling multituberculate mammals were diverse, and monitor lizards as large as the modern Komodo dragon hunted on the ground. Triceratops was the most abundant large dinosaur, and Thescelosaurus the most abundant small herbivorous dinosaur. Edmontosaur remains have been collected here from stream channel sands, and include fossils from individuals as young as a meter- or yard-long infant. The edmontosaur fossils probably represent accumulations from groups on the move.

It was closer to a large delta than the Hell Creek Formation depositional setting to the north and received much more sediment. Tropical araucarian conifers and palm trees dotted the hardwood forests, differentiating the flora from the northern coastal plain. The climate was humid and subtropical, with conifers, palmettos, and ferns in the swamps, and conifers, ash, live oak, and shrubs in the forests. Freshwater fish, salamanders, turtles, diverse lizards, snakes, shorebirds, and small mammals lived alongside the dinosaurs. Small dinosaurs are not known in as great of abundance here as in the Hell Creek rocks, but Thescelosaurus once again seems to have been relatively common. Triceratops is known from many skulls, which tend to be somewhat smaller than those of more northern individuals. The Lance Formation is the setting of two edmontosaur "mummies".

See also

 Timeline of hadrosaur research

Notes
 Many of the original references deal with specimens or species that were not assigned to E. annectens until later. This is particularly true with the specimens long known, chronologically, as Diclonius mirabilis, Anatosaurus copei, and Anatotitan copei.
 This toothless section is also known as a diastema.

References

Late Cretaceous dinosaurs of North America
Saurolophines
Lance fauna
Maastrichtian life
Hell Creek fauna
Scollard fauna
Paleontology in Montana
Paleontology in South Dakota
Paleontology in North Dakota
Paleontology in Wyoming
Paleontology in Colorado
Paleontology in Saskatchewan
Maastrichtian species
Taxa named by Othniel Charles Marsh
Fossil taxa described in 1892